Hayat Şarkısı (English title: Song of Life) is a Turkish romantic drama television series, starring Burcu Biricik, Birkan Sokullu, Tayanç Ayaydın, Ecem Özkaya, Ahmet Mümtaz Taylan and Seray Gözler. It premiered on Kanal D on February 9, 2016 and concluded on June 6, 2017. The drama is the Turkish remake of the Korean Flames of Desire.

Synopsis
Born and raised in Işıklar Village near Mudanya, Bayram and his only friend Salih, who was his blood brother while growing up, engage their children Melek and Kerim at a young age in order to bind a conflict between them sweetly, and they continue to live in different cities until the children grow up and reach the age of marriage.

Having two children, Bayram does not forget his promise, even though he developed his business in Istanbul where he settled with his family and made a great fortune. He takes his young son Kerim with him on the day he graduated from university and knocks on the door of Salih, who lives with his two daughters, Hülya and Melek in Işıklar Village. Salih is also loyal to his promise and they finalize the wedding decision of the children with the arrival of Bayram. However, the children of both families have established a life of their own over the past years and have turned towards different loves and goals. Although young people make decisions about this compulsory marriage among themselves and relax with the solutions they find; Hulya's plans, which they did not take into account at all, have already been put into effect.

Cast
 Burcu Biricik as Hülya Çamoğlu Cevher
 Birkan Sokullu as Kerim Cevher
 Tayanç Ayaydın as Hüseyin Cevher
 Ecem Özkaya as Melek Çamoğlu Cevher
 Ahmet Mümtaz Taylan as Bayram Cevher
 Seray Gözler as Süheyla Cevher
 Deniz Hamzaoğlu as Kaya
 Pelin Öztekin as Zeynep Namıkoğlu
 Olgun Toker as Mahir Duru
 Almila Bağrıaçık as Filiz Namlı
 Aydan Taş as Nilay
 Recep Güneysu as Cem Darende
 Ahmet Melih Yılmaz as Cambaz

References

External links
  
 

2016 Turkish television series debuts
2017 Turkish television series endings
Turkish drama television series
Romance television series
Kanal D original programming
Television shows set in Istanbul
Television series produced in Istanbul
Television series set in the 2010s